Michelle Mitchenor is an American actress. She is known for portraying the series regular role of Detective Sonya Bailey on the FOX's primetime action comedy-drama television series Lethal Weapon and the role of Indigo in the musical-drama film Chi-Raq.

Early years
Mitchenor attended Ocean County Performing Arts Academy High School in New Jersey to study dancing and acting. Mitchenor attended Towson University, where she graduated Bachelor of Fine Arts for dancing.

Career
Mitchenor was cast for Spike Lee’s musical-drama film Chi-Raq. In August of 2016, it was announced that Mitchenor was cast as the role Detective Sonya Bailey on FOX action comedy-drama television series Lethal Weapon.

Personal life
In Oct 2017 , Mitchenor became engaged to actor Coley Speaks.

Filmography

References

External links
 

Living people
American television actresses
African-American actresses
1988 births
21st-century African-American people
21st-century African-American women
20th-century African-American people
20th-century African-American women